Forestry England is a division of the Forestry Commission, responsible for managing and promoting publicly owned forests in England. It was formed as Forest Enterprise in 1996, before devolving to Forest Enterprise England on 31 March 2003 and then being rebranded to Forestry England on 1 April 2019.

Its mission is to connect everyone with the nation’s forests by creating and caring for our forests for people to enjoy, wildlife to flourish and businesses to grow. It operates under the Forestry Act(s) and subsequent legislation and is part of the Civil Service and an Executive Agency of the Forestry Commission.

Operation
Forestry England is headquartered in Bristol, and for organisational purposes it divides England into six forest regions each with their own regional office:
North England, based in Bellingham, Northumberland near Hexham.
Yorkshire, based in Pickering, North Yorkshire.
Central England, based in Mansfield, Nottinghamshire.
West England, based in Coleford, Gloucestershire.
East England, based in Santon Downham, Suffolk.
South England, based in Lyndhurst, Hampshire.

It also manages Westonbirt Arboretum in Gloucestershire, perhaps the most important and widely known arboretum in the United Kingdom.

The nation’s forests
Forestry England manages 1,500 woodland and forest areas covering around  spread from Northumberland to Cornwall, Shropshire to Norfolk, making them England’s largest land manager. Around half of England’s softwood production arises from the estate and supports hundreds of small businesses and several large sawmills that rely on a guaranteed supply of timber to attract capital investment. Over 230 million people visit the public forest estate each year which supports over 70 substantial business partners on the estate, delivering most of the Forest Centre services, bike hire and other outdoor activities. Alongside all the economic and recreational activity, some 45% of the estate contributes to England’s most precious National Park landscapes and Areas of Outstanding Natural Beauty. Additionally,  are designated Sites of Special Scientific Interest in recognition of their value for nature, virtually all of which is in sound or recovering ecological condition and accessible to the public.

See also
List of ancient woods in England
Forestry in the United Kingdom

References

External links
 

Organisations based in Bristol
Environmental organisations based in England
Forestry in the United Kingdom
Forestry agencies in the United Kingdom
British landowners
Executive agencies of the United Kingdom government